Viktor Valentinovich Ivanenko (19 September 1947 – 1 January 2023) was a Soviet-Russian security officer.

Ivanenko died in Moscow on 1 January 2023, at the age of 75.

References

1947 births
2023 deaths
KGB officers
People's commissars and ministers of the Russian Soviet Federative Socialist Republic
Communist Party of the Soviet Union members
Recipients of the Order of the Red Star
People from Tyumen Oblast